John Patrick (born 1898) was an Ulster Unionist Party politician and soldier. He was elected at the 1938 Northern Ireland general election as a Member of Parliament (MP) for Mid Antrim, and held the seat until the 1945 general election.

References

1898 births
Year of death missing
Members of the House of Commons of Northern Ireland 1938–1945
Ulster Unionist Party members of the House of Commons of Northern Ireland
Members of the House of Commons of Northern Ireland for County Antrim constituencies